Gulzhanat Zhanatbek (born 30 November 1991) is a female Kazakhstani long-distance runner. She competed in the marathon event at the 2015 World Championships in Athletics and 2016 Olympics, and placed third at the 2015 Asian Marathon Championships.

References

1991 births
Living people
Kazakhstani female long-distance runners
World Athletics Championships athletes for Kazakhstan
Athletes (track and field) at the 2016 Summer Olympics
Athletes (track and field) at the 2018 Asian Games
Olympic athletes of Kazakhstan
Athletes (track and field) at the 2014 Asian Games
Asian Games competitors for Kazakhstan